Pervoye Maya literally means "1st of May", the International Workers' Day.

It may refer to:
Pervoye Maya, Russia, name of several inhabited localities in Russia
Pervoye Maya, Almaty, Kazakhstan
Pervoye Maya, Jalal-Abad, a village in Bazar-Korgon District, Jalal-Abad Region, Kyrgyzstan
Pervoye Maya, Kara-Kulja, a village in Kara-Kulja District, Osh Region, Kyrgyzstan
Pervoye Maya, alternative name of Bir May, a village in Azerbaijan